Stealey is the codename for a low-power x86 architecture microprocessor based on a Dothan core derived from the Intel Pentium M, built on a 90 nm process with 512 KB L2 cache and 400 MT/s front side bus (FSB). It was branded as Intel A100 and Intel A110 and appeared as part of the McCaslin platform. They were replaced in 2008 by the Menlow platform, including the 45 nm Silverthorne CPU and Poulsbo SCH.

The A110 runs at 800 MHz, the A100 at 600 MHz, and both have a TDP of 3 watts, and a power consumption in the lowest power state of only 0.4 watts.

The A100 and A110 processors are part of the Intel Ultra Mobile Platform 2007 and were designed to be used in MIDs, UMPCs and Ultralight laptops.

See also
 Pentium M (microarchitecture)
 Mobile Internet device (MID)
 Intel Atom - Intel's successor for this market
 AMD Geode - A similar x86 chip from a different manufacturer

References

A100